Le Mesnil-Lieubray is a commune in the Seine-Maritime department in the Normandy region in northern France.

Geography

Heraldry

Population

Places of interest
 The church of St. Geneviève, dating from the thirteenth century.
 A fourteenth-century fortified manorhouse called the Château de la Reine Blanche (allegedly owned by Asif Ali Zardari, President of Pakistan).

See also
Communes of the Seine-Maritime department

References

Communes of Seine-Maritime